Men's freestyle 120 kilograms competition at the 2012 Summer Olympics in London, United Kingdom, took place on 11 August at ExCeL London.
This freestyle wrestling competition consisted of a single-elimination tournament, with a repechage used to determine the winners of two bronze medals. The two finalists faced off for gold and silver medals. Each wrestler who lost to one of the two finalists moved into the repechage, culminating in a pair of bronze medal matches featuring the semifinal losers each facing the remaining repechage opponent from their half of the bracket.

Each bout consisted of up to three rounds, lasting two minutes apiece. The wrestler who scored more points in each round was the winner of that rounds; the bout finished when one wrestler had won two rounds (and thus the match).

China's Liang Lei was on the start list but did not compete due to injury.

In January 2019, Georgia's Davit Modzmanashvili, who originally won the silver medal, was disqualified after testing positive for banned substances. On 23 July 2019, it was announced that as a result of retesting samples, original gold medalist Artur Taymazov was also disqualified.

Consequently, the original bronze medalists, Komeil Ghasemi of Iran and Bilyal Makhov of Russia, were declared joint Olympic champions, while Tervel Dlagnev of the United States and Daulet Shabanbay of Kazakhstan, who Ghasemi and Makhov had defeated in the repechage, were awarded the bronze medals.

Schedule
All times are British Summer Time (UTC+01:00)

Results
Legend
F — Won by fall

Final

Top half

Bottom half

Repechage

Final standing 

 Artur Taymazov of Uzbekistan originally won the gold medal, but was disqualified after he tested positive for Chlorodehydromethyltestosterone.
 Davit Modzmanashvili of Georgia originally won the silver medal, but was disqualified after he tested positive for Chlorodehydromethyltestosterone.

References

External links
Page 14

Wrestling at the 2012 Summer Olympics
Men's events at the 2012 Summer Olympics